This is a list of notable Japanese exchange-traded funds, or ETFs.

 Listed in Osaka Securities Exchange
 1309 SSE50 Index Linked Exchange Traded Fund
 1312 Small Cap Core Index Linked Exchange Traded Fund (Russell/Nomura)
 1320 Daiwa ETF - Nikkei 225 – tracks the Nikkei 225
 1321 Nikkei 225 Exchange Traded Fund (Nomura)  – tracks the Nikkei 225
 1328 Gold-Price-Linked Exchange Traded Fund
 1323 NEXT FUNDS FTSE/JSE Africa Top40 Linked Exchange Traded Fund
 1324 NEXT FUNDS Russia RTS Linked Exchange Traded Fund
 Listed in Tokyo Stock Exchange
 1305 Daiwa ETF-TOPIX
 1306 TOPIX ETF
 1308 Nikko Exchange Traded TOPIX
 1310 Daiwa ETF TOPIX Core 30
 1311 TOPIX Core 30 Exchange Traded
 1313    KODEX 200
 1314 Listed Index Fund S&P Japan Emerging Equity 100
 1316 Listed Index Fund TOPIX100 Japan Large Cap Equity
 1317    Listed Index Fund TOPIX Mid400 Japan Mid Cap Equity
 1318    Listed Index Fund TOPIX Small Japan Small Cap Equity
 1319 Nikkei 300
 1322    Listed Index Fund China A Share (Panda) CSI300
 1326    SPDR Gold Shares
 1325 NEXT FUNDS Ibovespa Linked Exchange Traded Fund
 1346 NEXT FUNDS REIT INDEX ETF
 1327 EasyETF S&P GSCI-Class A USD Unit
 1329 i Shares Nikkei 225
 1330 Nikko Exchange Traded 225
 1344 MAXIS TOPIX Core30 ETF
 1345 Listed Index Fund J-REIT (Tokyo Stock Exchange REIT Index) Bi-Monthly Dividend Payment Type
 1610 Daiwa ETF TOPIX Electric Appliances
 1612 Daiwa ETF TOPIX Banks
 1613 TOPIX Electric Appliances Exchange Traded
 1615 TOPIX Banks
 1617    NEXT FUNDS TOPIX-17 FOODS ETF
 1618    NEXT FUNDS TOPIX-17 ENERGY RESOURCES ETF
 1619    NEXT FUNDS TOPIX-17 CONSTRUCTION & MATERIALS ETF
 1620  NEXT FUNDS TOPIX-17 RAW MATERIALS & CHEMICALS ETF
 1621    NEXT FUNDS TOPIX-17 PHARMACEUTICAL ETF
 1622    NEXT FUNDS TOPIX-17 AUTOMOBILES & TRANSPORTATION EQUIPMENT ETF
 1623    NEXT FUNDS TOPIX-17 STEEL & NONFERROUS ETF
 1624    NEXT FUNDS TOPIX-17 MACHINERY ETF
 1625    NEXT FUNDS TOPIX-17 ELECTRIC APPLIANCES & PRECISION INSTRUMENTS ETF
 1626    NEXT FUNDS TOPIX-17 IT & SERVICES, OTHERS ETF
 1627    NEXT FUNDS TOPIX-17 ELECTRIC POWER & GAS ETF
 1628    NEXT FUNDS TOPIX-17 TRANSPORTATION & LOGISTICS ETF
 1629    NEXT FUNDS TOPIX-17 COMMERCIAL & WHOLESALE TRADE ETF
 1630    NEXT FUNDS TOPIX-17 RETAIL TRADE ETF
 1631    NEXT FUNDS TOPIX-17 BANKS ETF
 1632    NEXT FUNDS TOPIX-17 FINANCIALS (EX BANKS) ETF
 1633    NEXT FUNDS TOPIX-17 REAL ESTATE ETF
 1634 Daiwa ETF・TOPIX-17 FOODS
 1635 Daiwa ETF・TOPIX-17 ENERGY RESOURCES
 1636 Daiwa ETF・TOPIX-17 CONSTRUCTION & MATERIALS
 1637 Daiwa ETF・TOPIX-17 RAW MATERIALS & CHEMICALS
 1638 Daiwa ETF・TOPIX-17 PHARMACEUTICAL
 1639 Daiwa ETF・TOPIX-17 AUTOMOBILES & TRANSPORTATION EQUIPMENT
 1640 Daiwa ETF・TOPIX-17 STEEL & NONFERROUS METALS
 1641 Daiwa ETF・TOPIX-17 MACHINERY
 1642 Daiwa ETF・TOPIX-17 ELECTRIC APPLIANCES & PRECISION INSTRUMENTS
 1643 Daiwa ETF・TOPIX-17 IT & SERVICES, OTHERS
 1644 Daiwa ETF・TOPIX-17 ELECTRIC POWER & GAS
 1645 Daiwa ETF・TOPIX-17 TRANSPORTATION & LOGISTICS
 1646 Daiwa ETF・TOPIX-17 COMMERCIAL & WHOLESALE TRADE
 1647 Daiwa ETF・TOPIX-17 RETAIL TRADE
 1648 Daiwa ETF・TOPIX-17 BANKS
 1649 Daiwa ETF・TOPIX-17 FINANCIALS（EX BANKS
 1650 Daiwa ETF・TOPIX-17 REAL ESTATE

See also
List of American exchange-traded funds
List of exchange-traded funds

External Links
 Listed Issues - ETFs | Japan Exchange Group
 Listed Issues - ETFs - Leveraged and Inverse Products | Japan Exchange Group
 Listed Issues - ETNs | Japan Exchange Group
 Listed Issues - ETNs - Leveraged and Inverse Products | Japan Exchange Group

Japanese